Duri Kal (also Romanized as Dūrī Kal; also known as Daur-i-Kal, Door Kal, and Dūr Kal) is a village in Howmeh-ye Sharqi Rural District, in the Central District of Ramhormoz County, Khuzestan Province, Iran. At the 2006 census, its population was 173, in 36 families.

References 

Populated places in Ramhormoz County